Aniela Zofia Steinsbergowa, (born on 27 June 1896 in Vienna; died on 22 December 1988 in Warsaw) was a Polish lawyer known for her work in defending politically well-known cases.

In 1931, she was entered on the list of lawyers, which made her one of the first female lawyers in Poland. In 1934 she joined the Polish Socialist Party. During WWII she was active in the Żegota. After the war she became a co-founder of the Workers' Defense Committee and the Social Self-Defense Committee "KOR".

References

1896 births
1988 deaths
20th-century Polish lawyers
20th-century Polish politicians
Members of the Committee for Social Self-Defense KOR
Members of the Workers' Defence Committee
Lawyers from Vienna
Polish women lawyers
Żegota members
20th-century women lawyers
20th-century Polish women